John Whitley could refer to: 

John Robinson Whitley (1843-1922), British entrepreneur
John Henry Whitley (1866-1935), British politician
John Whitley (RAF officer) (1905-1997), British Air Marshal
John Whitley (prison warden) (born 1944), American corrections official
John E. Whitley (born 1970), American government official